Remnant cholesterol, also known as remnant lipoprotein, is a very atherogenic lipoprotein composed primarily of very low-density lipoprotein (VLDL) and intermediate-density lipoprotein (IDL). Stated another way, remnant cholesterol is all plasma cholesterol that is not LDL cholesterol or HDL cholesterol, which are triglyceride-poor lipoproteins. However, remnant cholesterol is primarily chylomicron and VLDL, and each remnant particle contains about 40 times more cholesterol than LDL.

According to one study, high remnant cholesterol is more predictive of myocardial infarction than any other lipid particle. Remnant cholesterol is especially predictive of coronary artery disease in patients with normal total cholesterol.

High plasma remnant cholesterol is associated with increased plasma triglyceride levels. Hypertriglyceridemia is characteristic of high plasma remnant cholesterol, but persons with high plasma triglycerides without high remnant cholesterol rarely have coronary artery disease.

Remnant cholesterol has about twice the association with ischemic heart disease as LDL cholesterol. Although remnant cholesterol tends to be higher in people who are overweight (high body mass index), normal-weight persons with high remnant cholesterol tend to have a higher risk of myocardial infarction.

Remnant cholesterol is associated with chronic inflammation, whereas LDL cholesterol is not.

See also
 Chylomicron remnant
 Lipid profile

References

External links
 RLP (Remnant Lipoprotein)

Cardiology
Lipid disorders
Lipoproteins